George Mason (16 September 1896 – July 1987) was an English professional footballer who played as a right winger for Frickley Colliery, Leeds United, Swindon Town and Mexborough Athletic.

References

1896 births
1987 deaths
English footballers
Frickley Athletic F.C. players
Leeds United F.C. players
Swindon Town F.C. players
Mexborough Athletic F.C. players
English Football League players
Association football wingers